Gwernydd Penbre is a Site of Special Scientific Interest (SSSI) in Carmarthenshire, Wales. Official sources - DEFRA and Natural Resources Wales - list the SSSI as Gwernydd Pembre; the spelling used in the SSSI Citation is used in this article.

SSSI
Its western boundary abuts the A484 road between Kidwelly and Pembrey.

The site is composed of former grazing marshlands reclaimed from salt marshes in the 18th century and now reverted to waterlogged pasture. The site is notable, according to the SSSI citation, for its biological features which include "an extensive reedbed and associated communities, the presence of the rare marsh pea, (Lathyrus palustris), the fen land invertebrate community, and the presence of a strong breeding population of Cetti's warblers (Cettia cetti)". The reed bed is one of the largest in Carmarthanshire, and supports reed warbler (Acrocephalus scirpaceus), reed bunting (Emberiza schoeniculus) and water rail (Rallus aquaticus). Eurasian bittern (Botaurus stellaris) visit in winter.

 of the site belong to Wildlife Trust: West Wales and the Llanelli Naturalists Society.

See also
List of Sites of Special Scientific Interest in Carmarthenshire

References

External links
SSSI Citation for Gwernydd Penbre
Citation map for Gwernydd Penbre
Your Special Site and its Future - Gwernydd Penbre SSSI overview from Natural Resources Wales
Gwernydd Penbre SSSI marked on DEFRA's MAGIC Map

Sites of Special Scientific Interest in Carmarthen & Dinefwr